La Vara (English: The Stick) was a Judeo-Spanish (Ladino) language weekly newspaper, published 1922–1948 in New York City, as a national Sephardi Jewish newspaper in the United States. It was edited by Albert Levy, a Salonican Jew, and had a circulation of 16,500 in 1928. Marc D. Angel counts it as one of the two most important such publications historically, the other being La America.

La Vara introduced an English-language section in 1934.

Notes

External links
La Vara, National Library of Israel

Communist periodicals published in the United States
Defunct newspapers published in New York City
Greek-American culture in New York City
Greek-Jewish culture in the United States
Jewish newspapers published in the United States
Jewish socialism
Judaeo-Spanish-language newspapers published in the United States
Non-English-language newspapers published in New York (state)
Newspapers established in 1922
Publications disestablished in 1948
Sephardi Jewish culture in New York City
Socialism in New York (state)
Spanish-American culture in New York City
Turkish-American culture in New York (state)